Trimiklini is a village in the Limassol District of Cyprus, located 9 km south of Pano Platres.

Climate

References

Communities in Limassol District